Žapuže is a settlement on the southeastern outskirts of Ajdovščina in the Littoral region of Slovenia. The village was burned down by the German Army on 22 June 1944.

The local church, renovated in 1989, is dedicated to Saint Peter, but is known as Saint Martin's Church and belongs to the Parish of Šturje.

References

External links 
Žapuže at Geopedia

Populated places in the Municipality of Ajdovščina